Stewie may refer to:

People
 Stewie Dempster (1903–1974), former New Zealand cricketer and coach
 Breanna Stewart (born 1994), American basketball player nicknamed "Stewie"

Animals
 Stewie (cat), once the world's longest domestic cat

Characters
Stewie the Duck, the titular character in the eponymous children's book series and app created by Kim and Stew Leonard Jr.
 Stewie Griffin, a fictional character in the American animated TV series Family Guy

See also
Stew (disambiguation)
Stewart (disambiguation)
Stu (disambiguation)
Stuart (disambiguation)